Robert Edward Czyz (born February 10, 1962) is an American retired boxer and commentator. Czyz was a two-division world titlist at light heavyweight and cruiserweight.

Czyz was born in Orange, New Jersey. He grew up in Wanaque, New Jersey and attended Lakeland Regional High School. He is three quarters Italian and one quarter Polish. His younger brother is avant-garde fiction writer Vincent Czyz.

Nicknamed "the Matinee Idol", Czyz was a member of the United States amateur boxing team whose other members died aboard LOT Polish Airlines Flight 007 when it crashed in 1980. Czyz did not make the trip as he was recovering from injuries sustained in a car accident.

Amateur career
As an amateur, Czyz was doing his best to secure his spot at the U.S. Olympic team for the eventually missed 1980 Moscow Olympics. He was one of a few boxers (along with Sal Cenicola and Tony Tucker) who survived the LOT Flight 7 crash by staying at home in the United States. He finished his amateur career having 26 fights under his belt, with a record of 24 wins, 2 losses.

Professional career
Czyz had a quick start to his professional boxing career in the early 1980s, and he was soon in line for a shot against world middleweight champion Marvin Hagler. He had to start from scratch, however, after suffering a one-sided, 10-round loss at the hands of veteran Mustafa Hamsho on November 20, 1982 in a bout that was nationally televised.

Czyz went up in weight, put another string of wins together, and in September 1986, he finally found himself in a ring with an undefeated world champion, IBF light heavyweight champion Slobodan Kačar (Olympic Gold medallist of 1980). Czyz beat him in five rounds.

Czyz made three defenses: a one-round defeat of David Sears, a see-saw second-round KO of Willie Edwards, and a fifth-round TKO of Jim McDonald - before taking on 'Prince' Charles Williams in October 1987.  Czyz scored an early knockdown of Williams, yet the challenger not only stayed in the fight, but also hammered shut Czyz' left eye en route to scoring a TKO victory and thus seizing the title after eight rounds of boxing.

Czyz then lost a decision to Dennis Andries in May 1988, followed by a couple of victories, in turn followed by two cracks at the world title in 1989.  Czyz, despite truly good efforts on his part in both challenges, lost both of them - a 12-round decision to Virgil Hill in North Dakota for the WBA version in March, and a 10th-round TKO loss to Williams in an IBF title rematch in June.

Czyz went on to stop then-undefeated Andrew Maynard in seven rounds (the second undefeated Gold medallist he KO'd) in June 1990, then jumped up to cruiserweight. He challenged Robert Daniels for Daniels' WBA world cruiserweight championship in March 1991, and won a unanimous decision. Two defenses, against Bash Ali and Donny Lalonde, were made (both by unanimous decision) before Czyz vacated the title.

In 1994, Czyz  became a television boxing analyst working alongside Steve Albert and Ferdie Pacheco whilst continuing his boxing career. The trio covered fights in many locations worldwide. In December 1994, he covered the first world title fight ever held in Ecuador as a member of Showtime's crew.

In 1996, he stepped up to the heavyweight division, but lost by knockout in five rounds to Evander Holyfield and quickly retired. Czyz fought one last time in 1998, losing by second-round TKO to South African Corrie Sanders. Czyz continued doing color commentary for Showtime, but was let go after pleading guilty to his fourth drunken-driving offense in six years after being caught speeding in Readington Township, New Jersey. Czyz's case received a lot of attention as he was a multiple repeat DUI case, and was a driver behind the NJ Assembly revisiting its legislation. Czyz, who was a Raritan Township, New Jersey resident at the time, was given a six-month license suspension for each of his three drunken driving convictions in 1998, 1999 and 2000. It was discovered that he was sentenced improperly as a first-time offender after his fourth arrest, which occurred in February 2003 in Readington Township, where he was caught driving with a blood-alcohol level of 0.14 percent. The state limit at that time was 0.10 percent.

Professional boxing record

Outside the ring
Czyz married actress and photographer Kimberly Ross (October 8, 1959 – December 19, 2006) on October 27, 1992. Their daughter, Mercedes Czyz, was born September 27, 1993. They were divorced by the time Kimberly died, after a long battle with breast cancer, aged 47.

He has since been inducted into the Polish-American Sports Hall of Fame.

Czyz is a member of Mensa, the organization for people who have scored in the highest 2% of takers in an IQ test.  He even wore a shirt with "MENSA" on it while walking to the ring to fight Evander Holyfield.

See also
List of world light-heavyweight boxing champions
List of world cruiserweight boxing champions

References

External links

Michael Swann's 2007 multi-part interview with Bobby Czyz
Part One
Part Two
Part Three
Follow-up

 

1962 births
Living people
American male boxers
Boxers from New Jersey
Lakeland Regional High School alumni
People from Orange, New Jersey
People from Wanaque, New Jersey
Sportspeople from Essex County, New Jersey
Sportspeople from Passaic County, New Jersey
Middleweight boxers
Light-heavyweight boxers
Cruiserweight boxers
Heavyweight boxers
World light-heavyweight boxing champions
World cruiserweight boxing champions
International Boxing Federation champions
World Boxing Association champions
Mensans
American people of Italian descent
American people of Polish descent
Boxing commentators